Castle Park High School, established in 1962, is a high school in Chula Vista, California.  It offers Advanced Placement classes.  Along with Bonita Vista High School, it is one of only two schools in the Sweetwater Union School District that offers International Baccalaureate classes. Many of Castle Park's classrooms were renovated in 2006 by Turner Construction Company, and as result classrooms now are air-conditioned with energy-efficient lighting and windows. Classrooms are also now internet ready and have new whiteboards, cabinets, flooring, and paint. The school's landscape was recently cleaned up in 2009 - 2010, and the entire school was repainted on the exterior with a more rich, earth-toned tan color in 2011.  These much-needed improvements will be followed up by another phase of construction which is slated to begin within the next few years with Proposition O.

Departments
Departments are:
English / Language Arts,
Special Education,
Math,
Technology,
Physical Education  (2 years of P.E. required),
Visual and Performing Arts (Art, Drama),
Science  (Biology, Chemistry, Physics),
World Languages ( Spanish:  offered as IB/AP programs), and
Social Science.

Programs
Available programs are:
Advance Placement (AP),
ACE Mentor Program, sponsored by Turner Construction since 2006,
AVID,
English Language Learners (ELL),
Gifted And Talented Education (GATE),
International Baccalaureate (IB),
Peer Counseling,
PUENTE,
UCSD Upward Bound Classic Program,
School of Business Leadership (SBL),
Special Education, and
Science Innovation Academy (SIA).

Sports
Fall:
Football,
Golf,
Cross Country,
Cheer Leaders,
Tennis (Girls),
Volleyball (Girls), and
Water Polo (Boys).

Winter:
Basketball (Girls),
Roller Hockey,
Soccer (Boys),
Soccer (Girls),
Wrestling, and
Water Polo (Girls).

Spring:
Baseball,
Golf,
Softball,
Swimming,
Tennis (Boys),
Track & Field, Beach Volleyball (Girls) and
Volleyball (Boys).

Clubs
Clubs include:
Thespian/Drama Club,
AASU,
Grupo Folklorico,
Puente,
Academic League,
Year Book,
Robotics,
SBL,
AVID,
S.I.A.(Science Innovation Academy),
Spanish Club,
MECHA,
CSF,
Dance Company,
Trojan Brigade,
Ecology Club,
Cheer Leaders,
APSA, Rap Club and
Social Justice Club

Notable alumni
John Fox, NFL coach
Zeke Moreno, football player
Moses Moreno, football player
Jerome Haywood, football player
Benji Gil, baseball player
Steve Riley, football player
Alex Sanabia, baseball player
DeMarco Sampson, football player
Michael Farfan, soccer player, twin
Gabriel Farfán, soccer player, twin
 Luq Barcoo, football player

See also
Education in California

References

Chula Vista Master School Index 
cph.sweetwaterschools.org

Educational institutions established in 1962
1962 establishments in California
High schools in San Diego County, California
International Baccalaureate schools in California
Public high schools in California
Education in Chula Vista, California